is a Japanese professional golfer.

Takeya plays on the Japan Golf Tour and the Japan Challenge Tour. He has one win on each tour. His win at the 2014 Japan Golf Tour Championship Mori Building Cup Shishido Hills earned him entry into the 2014 WGC-Bridgestone Invitational.

Professional wins (2)

Japan Golf Tour wins (1)

Japan Challenge Tour wins (1)

Results in World Golf Championships

"T" = Tied

References

External links

Japanese male golfers
Japan Golf Tour golfers
Sportspeople from Yamaguchi Prefecture
1980 births
Living people